Anders Ström (21 August 1901, Östnor, Sweden – 20 September 1986 in Östnor, Sweden) was a Swedish cross-country skier who competed in the 1928 Winter Olympics, where he finished seventh in the 50 km event. In 1931, he won Vasaloppet.

Cross-country skiing results

Olympic Games

References

External links
 Cross-country skiing 1928 

1901 births
1986 deaths
People from Mora Municipality
Cross-country skiers from Dalarna County
Swedish male cross-country skiers
Olympic cross-country skiers of Sweden
Cross-country skiers at the 1928 Winter Olympics
IFK Mora skiers